The Lady of the Camellias (French: La dame aux camélias, Italian: La signora dalle camelie) is a 1953 French-Italian historical drama film directed by Raymond Bernard and starring Micheline Presle, Gino Cervi and Roland Alexandre. It is based on the 1848 novel of the same title by Alexandre Dumas. It was shot in Gevacolour at the Billancourt Studios in Paris and on location around the city. The film's sets were designed by the art director Léon Barsacq.

Cast
 Micheline Presle as 	Marguerite Gauthier
 Gino Cervi as 	Monsieur Duval
 Roland Alexandre as Armand Duval 
 Alba Arnova as Olympe
 Jean Parédès as 	Comte Varville
 Jean Brochard as Le notaire
 Mathilde Casadesus as 	Prudence
 Jacques Clancy as 	Gaston Rieux
 Henri Crémieux as 	Chambourg
 Maurice Escande as 	Le duc 
 Jacques Famery as 	Un ami d'Armand
 Jane Morlet as 	Nanine
 Claude Nicot as 	Léon Chambourg
 Germaine Delbat as 	L'épouse du notaire
 Robert Seller as 	Le maître d'hôtel
 Javotte Lehman as 	Violette 
 Françoise Soulié as 	Blanche

References

Bibliography 
 Goble, Alan. The Complete Index to Literary Sources in Film. Walter de Gruyter, 1999.
 Hayward, Susan. French Costume Drama of the 1950s: Fashioning Politics in Film. Intellect Books, 2010.

External links 
 

1953 films
French drama films
Italian drama films
1953 drama films
1950s French-language films
Films directed by Raymond Bernard
Films based on French novels
Films shot at Billancourt Studios
Lux Film films
1950s French films
1950s Italian films
French-language Italian films